Faveria coriacella is a species of moth in the family Pyralidae. It was described by Ragonot in 1888. It is found in South Africa.

References

Moths described in 1888
Phycitini
Moths of Africa